Ethel Delali Cofie is an entrepreneur and an IT professional / consultant. She is from the Republic of Ghana and is the founding member of Women in Tech Africa, organization working for the empowerment of African women by enabling the technological source.

Education
Cofie has a bachelor's degree in Computer Science from the Valley View University in Ghana, a master's degree in Distribution Systems from the University of Brighton, and an Executive Degree in Leadership, Business and Entrepreneurship from the Yale School of Management.

Career and affiliations
She held various technological and commercial roles in her previous work in the United Kingdom, Nigeria, and Sierra Leone. She has also worked with Vodafone Ghana as Head of Commercial Solutions.

Cofie is the CEO and Founder of EDEL Technology Consulting, an IT consulting company in West Africa and Europe.

She has been featured on BBC and has had her opinion piece published on CNN on the topics of technology in emerging markets, and women leadership. She is a member of the board of companies across Africa including Egotickets and AMOSS Holdings SA.

Awards and recognition
Ethel and her initiatives have been recognized:
 Fellow of United States President Barack Obama's Young African Leaders Initiative Network (YALI)
 Named one of the Top 5 Women impacting IT in Africa
 Shortlisted for United Nations GEM Tech Award in October 2014.
 100 Most Outstanding Women Entrepreneurs In Ghana
 Africa Woman of Influence in Business: ICT Category
 Africa's Leading Women in IT 
 Recognised as Africa's Most Influential Woman in Business and Government for ICT by CEO Global
 USA Secretary of Commerce Penny Pritzker mentioned Ethel Cofie in her 2014 Global Entrepreneurship Summit speech in Morocco
 She won the 2020 Glitz Africa Ghana Women award

References

Yale School of Management alumni
Ghanaian businesspeople
Living people
Year of birth missing (living people)